is a Japanese mystery novel series written by Mai Mochizuki and illustrated by Shizu Yamauchi. Futabasha have published fourteen volumes since April 2015. A manga adaptation with art by Ichiha Akizuki has been serialized in Futabasha's seinen manga magazine Monthly Action since December 2017. It has been collected in five tankōbon volumes. An anime television series adaptation by Seven aired from July 9 to September 24, 2018 on TV Tokyo.

Synopsis
There is an antique shop in Kyoto's Teramachi Sanjou shopping district. High school girl Aoi Mashiro unexpectedly runs into Kiyotaka Yagashira, the son of the shop's owner, and ends up working part-time at the shop. Kiyotaka is called the "Holmes at Teramachi Sanjou", and he and Aoi solve odd cases brought to them by various clients.

Characters

Aoi is in her second year of high school and has moved from Omiya in Saitama to Kyoto, which caused a strained relationship with her friends back at home, and began working part-time at an antiques shop, Kura. Honest and straightforward, Aoi was hired by Kiyotaka due to him being convinced that she has good intuition with antiques and can see the true value and if the articles are genuine or not.

Kiyotaka is a 22-year-old graduate student at Kyoto University and an apprentice at his family's antique shop, Kura. He is handsome and seems very gentle, but he is strict with himself and those around him. His nickname "Holmes", while a pun off his surname, also stems from his amazing deduction skills, as shown when he is able to discern a fake antique from a con artist. 

A novice actor. He is very handsome, and because of the light color of his hair, has an aura like a half-Japanese person. His father is a famous author. Even though he grew up in Kyoto, thanks to the influence of his parents he speaks standard Japanese. No matter what, he is very agreeable, but he sees Kiyotaka as his rival.

He is said to be a genius scammer. Once, he lived as a priest, but when he met Kiyotaka, he started scamming again. He shaves off all his hair and wears Japanese style clothes. He is extremely nimble-fingered. He is good at sports and has a good eye for things.

Kiyotaka's grandfather and the owner of Kura.

Kiyotaka's father and Seiji's son. He is a novelist and the manager of Kura, but he leaves the actual management to Kiyotaka.

Aoi's classmate and the younger sister of Saori. Due to her family's financial issues, her sister being chosen as Saio-Dai caused a great strain on them due to the overwhelming costs of preparation needed to transform one into the Saio-Dai. To persuade her sister to turn down the role, she wrote her a threatening letter telling her to not be the Saio-Dai, but in the end she is convinced that it would be the best for her sister to become the Saio-Dai after all.

Saori is a university student who was chosen to be the Saio-Dai for the Aoi Festival. Because of her strained relationship with two of her former friends, their relationship took a darker turn when she was chosen as the Saio-Dai, thus she began writing threats to herself in the hopes her friends would worry for her. 

Rikyu is a cheeky little boy. Because he looked feminine from a very young age on, he started to train his body and studied judo in France. His respect for Kiyotaka is over the top and he judges Aoi strictly.

Media

Novel
The novel is written by Mai Mochizuki and illustrated by Shizu Yamauchi. Futabasha have published eighteen volumes since April 2015. During their Anime Expo Lite panel, J-Novel Club announced that they have licensed the novel.

Manga
Written and illustrated by Ichiha Akizuki, it has been serialized in Futabasha's seinen manga magazine Monthly Action since December 2017. It has been collected in eight tankōbon volumes.

Anime
An anime television series adaptation by Seven aired from July 9 to September 24, 2018, on TV Tokyo. The series is directed by Tokihiro Sasaki, with scripts handled by Kenichi Yamashita, and character designs by Yōsuke Itō. Crunchyroll streamed the series. Discotek Media licensed the series and released it on home video in July 2022.

Reception

Previews
Anime News Network (ANN) had five editors review the first episode of the anime: Paul Jensen felt the first antique appraisal wasn't engaging and lacked "emotional involvement" for the viewers but praised Aoi's appraisal for delivering "a much better story" with both personal and emotional stakes, saying that the subject matter being used for character development was a "novel concept" and is worth seeing more of the show; James Beckett praised the "lush, colorful aesthetic", Aoi and Yagashira's characterizations and their "undeniable chemistry" elevating the "potentially dry material", concluding that he expects the antique mysteries to stand alongside the slice-of-life elements with intriguing threads; Theron Martin praised Yagashira's character work and both the Aoi romantic angle and counterfeit story arc showing potential but was critical of the "measured pacing" and limited "visual variety" making the show fall "a bit on the dry side", concluding that the show will find its audience and encourage more to watch it; Rebecca Silverman commented that the show's set-up of appraising Japanese antiques will depend on the viewers' interest in that subject matter, concluding that "if you're a fan of slice of life, it may be worth checking out." The fifth reviewer, Nick Creamer, wrote that: "Holmes of Kyoto offers a surprisingly natural mix of mystery, pawn shop drama, character drama, and slice of life atmosphere. Making natural use of its Sherlock Holmes gimmick and offering a satisfying narrative even within this first episode, it's a low-key but confident and engaging production. Holmes gets a thumbs up from me."

Series reception
Silverman and fellow ANN editor Amy McNulty chose Holmes of Kyoto as their pick for the Worst Anime of Summer 2018, the former calling it disappointing with its "tedious mysteries" and "slow-burn romance" causing the show to feel unfocused and conflicted with the billing of its main genre, and the latter saying it suffers from "poor story choices and bad characterization" that makes it come across as "melodramatic" and "strain[s] credulity." Silverman chose the series as her pick for the Worst Anime of 2018, saying that despite the Aoi-Yagashira relationship being "fun to watch" she criticized the overall premise for lacking in quality mysteries and neglecting the counterfeiter subplot, concluding that "as far as an anime series goes, this alternately bored and frustrated me, which is not what I'm looking for in my entertainment." Tim Jones, writing for THEM Anime Reviews, wrote that: "Holmes of Kyoto isn't a bad show, but it's largely forgettable. It has decent leads, but the side characters are either underutilized or obnoxious. The art is solid, but the animation is bare-bones. It has a lot of stories, but few of them are particularly engaging."

Notes

References

External links
 
 

2015 Japanese novels
Anime and manga based on novels
Crunchyroll anime
Crunchyroll manga
Futabasha manga
J-Novel Club books
Japanese mystery novels
Japanese serial novels
Mystery anime and manga
Seinen manga
Seven (animation studio)
TV Tokyo original programming